Kelor Kirti is a 2016 Indian Bengali language comedy film. It was directed by Raja Chanda and produced by Shrikant Mohta and Nispal Singh under the banner of Shree Venkatesh Films and Surinder Films. The film stars Dev, Sayantika Banerjee, Jisshu Sengupta, Ankush Hazra, Mimi Chakraborty, Nusrat Jahan and Koushani Mukherjee. It is a remake of 2002 Tamil film Charlie Chaplin and No Entry. The film was released on 6 July 2016, on the occasion of Eid and Ratha Yatra. It received mostly poor reviews from critics. The Times of India which gave it 1.5 stars from 5. The film was not successful at the box office.

Cast
 Dev as Guru
 Jisshu Sengupta as Joy, editor of "News Portal" 
Ankush Hazra as Apurba, Joy's junior
 Mimi Chakraborty as Rima (Joy's wife)
 Koushani Mukherjee as Anushka (Apurba's wife)
 Nusrat Jahan as Urboshi
 Sayantika Banerjee as Priya (Guru's wife)
 Kharaj Mukherjee as Gadadhar/Dhanudhar
 Rudranil Ghosh as Urvashi's friend
 Kanchan Mullick as Poncha Sastri
 Biswajit Chakraborty as Home Minister Haranath Mittir
 Manasi Sinha as Minister's wife(cameo)
 Rohit Mukherjee as Anushka's father
 Debomay Mukherjee as Apurba's friend
Sargami Rumpa as Bijli, Joy's house maid
 Tori-Lao-Lee as special appearance in song "Love Me"

Synopsis
An enchanting woman enters a couple's lives, leading them to confusion. They are all caught up in misunderstandings and humorous situations, which end in chaos.

Soundtrack

The soundtrack was composed by Dev Sen and Indraadip Dasgupta. It was released on 1 July 2016.

References

External links

Bengali-language Indian films
2010s Bengali-language films
2016 films
Bengali remakes of Tamil films
Indian comedy films
Films directed by Raja Chanda
Films scored by Indradeep Dasgupta
Films scored by Dev Sen